The Green Dragon is a public house and inn located in St Thomas Square  Monmouth, Wales. The pub provides live music on weekend evenings and during the annual Monmouth Festival the pub is used as a venue for entertainment.

History
The pub is the oldest surviving pub in the Overmonnow area and established on a site of archaeological interest. It was established as an inn before 1801 when the keys for St Thomas Church were kept there. In 1830s beer tokens were issued by the then landlord Thomas Powell who was followed by a long list of his family in the job of Licensee of the pub. A James Gwilliam was the licensee for decades of the 19th century following that.

In 1998 an archaeological dig evaluation carried out behind the inn produced medieval finds such as cooking utensils and clay pipes dating from the 18th and 19th centuries.

The Green Dragon faces one of the entrances to the medieval Monnow Bridge and the Church of St Thomas the Martyr. The pub currently faces a traffic island that includes a restored cross.

Gallery

Notes

Pubs in Monmouth